414 Light Street is a building located on Light Street in the Inner Harbor district of Baltimore, Maryland that consists of a 44-story glass and steel structure completed in 2018.

History

Demolition of McCormick Factory
Located at the intersection of Light and Conway streets in Downtown Baltimore, 414 Light Street was built on the original site of the McCormick & Company. The 1921 industrial complex was a fond memory of many Baltimoreans  for the spice aromas that wafted down to the streets below. The McCormick building was razed in 1988 after the company had left the city for Hunt Valley. The demolition of the original factory was heartily fought by preservationists, but The Rouse Company, developers of Columbia and Harborplace, won in the Maryland Court of Appeals. The Rouse Company's plans for a replacement structure never came to fruition, leaving the property as a vacant parking lot.

Construction of 414 Light
After 25 years as a parking lot, construction began on 414 Light Street in 2014. Designed by famed Chicago architect Solomon Cordwell Buenz, the building has a contemporary style. The project is notable for being Baltimore's tallest apartment building, and third tallest skyscraper after the 1929 Bank of America Building. Construction finished at the end of 2018.

Tenants
The building is home to 394 apartments as well as retail on the ground floor. The apartments are considered luxury-style from $1,800, and penthouse rentals at more than $8,000 a month per unit.

References

Downtown Baltimore
Inner Harbor, Baltimore
Residential buildings completed in 2018
2018 establishments in Maryland
Apartment buildings in Baltimore